Zenjirō, Zenjiro or Zenjirou  is a masculine Japanese given name.

Possible writings
Zenjirō can be written using different combinations of kanji characters. Some examples:

The characters used for "jiro" (二郎 or 次郎) literally means "second son" and usually used as a suffix to a masculine name, especially for the second child. The "zen" part of the name can use a variety of characters, each of which will change the meaning of the name ("善" for virtuous, "全" for al, "然" and so on).

善二郎, "virtuous, second son"
善次郎, "virtuous, second son"
全二郎, "all, second son"
全次郎, "all, second son"

Other combinations...

善治郎, "virtuous, to manage/cure, son"
善次朗, "virtuous, next, clear"
全治郎, "all, to manage/cure, son"
全次朗, "all, next, clear"
然次朗, "so, next, clear"

The name can also be written in hiragana ぜんじろう or katakana ゼンジロウ.

Notable people with the name

, Japanese politician and cabinet minister
, Japanese politician
, Japanese figure skater
, Japanese entrepreneur
, Japanese field hockey coach

Fictional characters
Zenjiro, a character in the manga series Kodocha
, a character in the anime series Digimon Xros Wars

Japanese masculine given names